K21OC-D is a low-powered television station affiliated with Rev'n, owned and operated by HC2 Holdings. It broadcasts on virtual channel 54 (UHF digital channel 20) and is licensed to Corpus Christi, Texas. It is not yet available on Charter Spectrum.

In June 2013, the then-K20JT-D was slated to be sold to Landover 5 LLC as part of a larger deal involving 51 other low-power television stations; the sale fell through in June 2016. Howard Mintz sold three stations, including K20JT-D, to HC2 Holdings in 2017.

The station was renamed K21OC-D on January 27, 2020, coincident with being licensed to move from digital channel 21 to digital channel 20.

References

External links

21OC-D
Low-power television stations in the United States
Television channels and stations established in 2006